Vinted is a Lithuanian online marketplace for buying, selling and exchanging new or secondhand items, mainly clothing and accessories.

History 
In 2008, Milda Mitkute and Justas Janauskas co-founded Vinted in Vilnius, Lithuania, testing a prototype site where Lithuanian women could trade their clothes. After recruiting a couch surfing guest of Janauskas to help with advertising and promotions, the two expanded their business into Germany, where it operates under the brand Kleiderkreisel. In 2010, Vinted launched in the United States.

In 2012, Vinted partnered with Lemon Labs, a Lithuanian-based app development consultancy to launch their mobile app. In a case study, Lemon Labs reported that before the app was released, 80% of the traffic came from desktop web and the rest from mobile web browsing. Within a day of its release, Vinted saw as much as a 30% traffic increase with the app.

In 2016, Vinted's management team was joined by the Dutch business man Thomas Plantenga as a strategy consultant. He has since become CEO of the company.

In 2019, Vinted became Lithuania's first tech unicorn by raising €128 million at €1 billion valuation in a round led by Lightspeed Venture Partners

In October 2020 Vinted acquired United Wardrobe, a Dutch competitor.

Business 
Available on iOS, Android, and desktop browsers, Vinted provides users a platform to sell their clothing and accessories, purchase or swap from other users, and communicate with members using the forums. Since their launch, Vinted has expanded into men's and children's clothing. As of 2022, Vinted is available in sixteen countries.

Fees 
Vinted charges buyers a service fee on each purchase. They also charge sellers a fee every time they "bump" their listings to the top of the catalog. Sellers can also choose, for a fee, to spotlight their wardrobe so that their full offerings appear in a horizontal scroll across the feed of certain buyers.

See also 

 Depop
 Poshmark

References

Retail companies established in 2008
Internet properties established in 2008
Online marketplaces of Lithuania
Online marketplaces of the United States
Online marketplaces of the United Kingdom